was an Italian television advertising show broadcast on RAI from 1957 to 1977. The series mainly showed short sketch comedy films using live action, various types of animation, and puppetry. It had an audience of about 20 million viewers.

History
Initially, the only income for Italian television broadcasters came from subscription fees, but the amount was still very low. Rai had already thought of introducing a space dedicated to advertising in the television schedule. RAI was looking for an original, innovative and interesting way to offer it to the public in a pleasant way through entertainment and shows without disturbing them. Then came the idea of making relatively long (average three minutes) funny curtains, comics and sketches, which attracted people's attention.

At an experimental level, some of the test procedures were performed with the proto-caroselli, based on fictitious products, made in Turin, Rome and Milan. In fact, this is what the carousel will look like two years later.

Animated segments
Carosello would feature hand drawn and stop-motion segments. Some of which would feature characters from Hanna-Barbera. Meanwhile, the original characters created for the series, including Pallina, were animated by Gamma Productions, who also animated The Adventures of Rocky and Bullwinkle and Friends.

Pallina (Italian for 'little ball') was an Italian cartoon character created by Quartetto Cetra for the series. She originally appeared in the 1960s, running from 1961 to 1968, and was a 60s mascot for various cleaning products, including Solex and Vetril.

References

Italian television series
1950s Italian television series
1957 Italian television series debuts
1960s Italian television series
1970s Italian television series
1977 Italian television series endings
Italian television shows featuring puppetry